Bill Wilson is a politician who was a Democratic member of the Montana House of Representatives from 2003 to 2011. Additionally, he was a member of the Montana State Senate from 1993 to 2001.

References

External links
Montana House of Representatives - Bill Wilson official MT State Legislature website
Project Vote Smart - Representative Bill Wilson (MT) profile
Follow the Money - Bill Wilson
 2008 2006 2004 2002 campaign contributions

Democratic Party members of the Montana House of Representatives
Living people
Year of birth missing (living people)